Willy (Wim) Van Grembergen (born 1947) is a Belgian organizational theorist and Professor of Information Systems Management at the University of Antwerp, and Academic Director of the IT Alignment and Governance Research Institute., known for his work on IT governance. His recent book on IT Governance: "Enterprise governance of information technology: Achieving strategic alignment and value", Springer, 2009.

Biography 
Van Grembergen received his PhD in Applied Economics. After graduation he started his academic career as guest professor at the Katholieke Universiteit Leuven. He was faculty member at the Stellenbosch University and the Institute of Business Studies in Moscow.

Back at the University of Antwerp early 1980s Van Grembergen started as lecturer in Business informatics and academic coordinator of the master programs IT-audit, and was Academic Director of the MBA Program from 1989 to 1995. Eventually he was appointed Professor of Information Systems Management and Chair of the Information Systems Management Department at the University of Antwerp, Economics and Management Faculty. Among his PhD students was Steven De Haes. He was also associated with the Antwerp Management School.

Publications 
Van Grembergen authored and co-authored many publications in the Business/IT alignment, Governance and Performance management. Books, a selection:
 Michel Daulie and Willy Van Grembergen. Ontwikkeling van administratieve systemen in BASIC. Malle : De Sikkel. 1985.
 Van Grembergen, Wim, ed. Strategies for information technology governance. Igi Global, 2004.

Articles, a selection:
 Van Grembergen, Wim, and Rik Van Bruggen. "Measuring and improving corporate information technology through the balanced scorecard." The Electronic Journal of Information Systems Evaluation 1.1 (1997).
 Van Grembergen, Wim, Steven De Haes, and Erik Guldentops. "Structures, processes and relational mechanisms for IT governance." Strategies for information technology governance 2.004 (2004): 1-36.
 De Haes, Steven, and Wim Van Grembergen. "IT governance structures, processes and relational mechanisms: achieving IT/business alignment in a major Belgian financial group." System Sciences, 2005. HICSS'05. Proceedings of the 38th Annual Hawaii International Conference on. IEEE, 2005.
 Van Grembergen, Wim. "Introduction to the Minitrack." System Sciences, 2007. HICSS 2007. 40th Annual Hawaii International Conference on. IEEE, 2007.

References

External links 
 Wim Van Grembergen, Universiteit Antwerpen

1947 births
Living people
Belgian business theorists
Academic staff of KU Leuven
Academic staff of Stellenbosch University
Academic staff of the University of Antwerp